Prince Sultan Muhammad was a member of the House of Shirvanshah. He was a son of Shirvanshah Keykubad I, brother of Shirvanshah Kavus, and father of Ibrahim I of Shirvan and Bahlul of Shirvan.

Life
His exact dates of birth and death are not known. He was made governor of Derbent during the reign of Shirvanshah Keykubad I. He became the ancestor of a junior branch of Shirvanshahs – the House of Derbent. During the reign of Shirvanshah Hushang, he was disgraced and forced to take refuge and hide in the Shaki region with his sons. He unfortunately died there.

References

Shirvanshahs
14th-century Iranian people
People from Derbent